William Henry McNichols Jr. (April 11, 1910 – May 29, 1997) served as the Mayor of Denver, Colorado from 1968 to 1983.

Biography
Born in Denver, McNichols was the son of Cassie and William H. McNichols Sr. His father served as Denver's City Auditor from 1931 until 1955. His younger brother, Stephen, served as Governor of Colorado from 1957 to 1963. After he graduated from Denver's East High School, he attended the University of Colorado-Boulder and then the University of Alabama, though he did not receive a degree from either institution.

During World War II, McNichols at age 33, enlisted in the Army and served in the 4th Armored Division (United States) engaged in the Siege of Bastogne. On April 4, 1945, the 4th armored Division liberated Ohrdruf concentration camp, the first Nazi camp liberated by U.S. troops. McNichols received three battle stars and the Purple Heart.

Political career
Appointed by Mayor Tom Currigan in 1963 as deputy mayor and manager of public works, Bill McNichols became mayor in December 1968 following Currigan's resignation to fill an executive position with Continental Airlines. Campaigning in the city elections of 1971, 1975, and 1979, McNichols won a return to city hall. Running for reelection in May 1983, he finished third in votes behind Federico Peña and Dale Tooley.   A significant factor in McNichols's failure to get re-elected was a two-day blizzard that began on December 24, 1982, and continued through the holiday. The massive storm dropped some two feet of snow, with more in some neighborhood; strong winds created impassible drifts.  The city was virtually paralyzed as city crews failed to clear the streets for days.

During his fourteen years in office, several construction projects changed the landscape of the city, including:
16th Street Mall
McNichols Sports Arena
Denver Center for the Performing Arts
Auraria Campus
The North Building addition to the Denver Art Museum
Expansions of Mile High Stadium
Twenty new pools and recreational center

From 1978–1979, McNichols served as president of the United States Conference of Mayors.

In 1985, McNichols received the Citizen of the West Award, given by the National Western Stock Show to those who personify the spirit and determination of the Western pioneer.

McNichols died at his home on May 29, 1997. He is buried in Mount Olivet Cemetery in Wheat Ridge, Colorado.

In 1999, the city's old Carnegie library building in Civic Center Park was renamed the McNichols Civic Center Building in honor of the McNichols family. Previously used as offices for the city administration, the Greek-revival style structure underwent restoration from 2011 to 2012 and now serves as a cultural center for public exhibitions and community events.

References

1910 births
1997 deaths
Colorado Democrats
Mayors of Denver
Military personnel from Colorado
University of Alabama alumni
University of Colorado Boulder alumni
20th-century American politicians
Presidents of the United States Conference of Mayors
United States Army personnel of World War II